Glen Weir (July 23, 1951 – March 13, 2023) was a Canadian professional football player who was a defensive lineman for the Montreal Alouettes/Montreal Concordes in the Canadian Football League (CFL).

Weir was born in London, Ontario, and played his amateur football with the London Lords intermediate league team. He had a 13-year career with the Alouettes from 1972 through 1982 and the Montreal Concordes from 1983 to 1984. He held the Alouettes' franchise record for most games with 203 until he was surpassed by Bryan Chiu in 2009. He played in five Grey Cup games, winning two, in 1974 and 1977. He was the Grey Cup Most Valuable Player (defensive) in 1977. He was also a five-time CFL All-Star. He was inducted into the Canadian Football Hall of Fame in 2009.

Canadian singer-songwriter Donovan Woods' song "My Cousin Has a Grey Cup Ring" was inspired by Weir, who is the cousin of Woods' father.

Weir died on March 13, 2023, at the age of 71.

References

1951 births
2023 deaths
Canadian football defensive linemen
Montreal Alouettes players
Montreal Concordes players
Canadian Football Hall of Fame inductees
Ontario Rugby Football Union players
Players of Canadian football from Ontario
Sportspeople from London, Ontario